Alampallam Venkatachalaiyer Balakrishnan  (1922-2015) was an American applied mathematician and professor at the University of California, Los Angeles.

Education and career
Balakrishnan grew up in Chennai, India, and entered the University of Madras in the early 1940s.  While there he earned a scholarship from the Indian government to study in the United States and learn to produce documentaries.  Upon arriving at the University of Southern California, known for its film school, he initially wanted to become a sound engineer on Hollywood films.  At the time, he was unable to get a position because he was not a member of any of the guilds, which controlled who was able to get a jobs.  Therefore, after earning his first master's degree in cinema in 1949, he switched to electrical engineering. Balakrishnan received his M.S. in electrical engineering and his Ph.D. in mathematics from the University of Southern California in 1950 and 1954, respectively.

He has been professor of engineering and professor of mathematics since 1965 at The University of California, Los Angeles. He was chair of the Department of Systems Science in the (then) School of Engineering from 1969 to 1975, and director of the NASA-UCLA Flight Systems Research Center since 1985.

Recognition
He was a recipient of the Richard E. Bellman Control Heritage Award, which is the highest recognition of professional achievement for US control systems engineers and scientists in 2001 for "pioneering contributions to stochastic and distributed systems theory, optimization, control, and aerospace flight systems research".

He has received honors and awards from the International Federation of Information Processing Society (1977), NASA (1978, 1992,1995, and 1996), and, in 1980, the Guillemin Prize in recognition of the major impact that his original contributions have had in setting the research direction of communications and control.

In 2016, USC Viterbi Professor Petros Ioannou became the inaugural A.V. “Bal” Balakrishnan Chair of the Ming Hsieh Department of Electrical Engineering.

References

External links
 UCLA faculty page
 USC Viterbi School of Engineering biography
 AACC profile
 
 USC A.V.(Bal) Balakrishnan Chair of the Ming Hsieh Department of Electrical Engineering

1922 births
2015 deaths
20th-century American mathematicians
20th-century Indian mathematicians
21st-century Indian mathematicians
Control theorists
USC School of Cinematic Arts alumni
University of California, Los Angeles faculty
Indian emigrants to the United States
Richard E. Bellman Control Heritage Award recipients
University of Madras alumni
Scientists from Chennai
Engineers from California
USC Viterbi School of Engineering alumni
21st-century American mathematicians